The 2013 Alabama A&M Bulldogs football team represented Alabama Agricultural and Mechanical University (Alabama A&M) in the 2013 NCAA Division I FCS football season. The Bulldogs were led by 12th-year head coach Anthony Jones and played their home games at Louis Crews Stadium. They were a member of the East Division of the Southwestern Athletic Conference and finished the season with a  record.

At SWAC Media Day, the Bulldogs were picked to finish third in the division. Additionally 5 Bulldogs players: Montaurius Corey Johnson, Reginald Bailey, Justin Goodrich, and Derrick Harris, were selected to the SWAC 2nd-team All-Conference.

Schedule

^Games aired on a tape delayed basis

References

Alabama AandM
Alabama AandM Bulldogs football team
Alabama A&M Bulldogs football seasons